Henry Stephen Baker (26 December 1904 – 7 November 1926) was an Australian-born cricketer who played a single first-class cricket match in New Zealand for Otago.

Baker was born at Melbourne in Victoria in 1904. He played in his only known cricket match during the 1925/26 season, against Canterbury. He scored a total of two runs in the match. Baker also played rugby union and was described as a "fine all-round athlete" and as a "prominent member of the Dunedin Football Club".

Baker lived in the Dunedin suburb of Kensington, and worked as a factory hand and as a clerk. He died in November 1926 at the age of 21, less than 12 months after his only first-class appearance. He drowned while swimming off Tomahawk beach in Dunedin.

References

External links

1904 births
1926 deaths
New Zealand cricketers
Otago cricketers
Burials at Andersons Bay Cemetery
Cricketers from Melbourne
Australian emigrants to New Zealand
Deaths by drowning in New Zealand
Accidental deaths in New Zealand